Ricky Teh (born 19 May 1963) is a Malaysian sport shooter. He competed in Men's Skeet Shooting event at the 2004  Summer Olympics, and came in 40th.

References

External links
Sports-reference bio

1963 births
Living people
Malaysian people of Chinese descent
Olympic shooters of Malaysia
Shooters at the 2004 Summer Olympics
Shooters at the 2006 Asian Games
Asian Games competitors for Malaysia